2nd Anpilogovo or Vtoroye Anpilogovo is a rural locality in Polyansky Selsoviet Rural Settlement, Kursky District, Kursk Oblast, Russia. Population:

Geography 
The village is located on the Bolshaya Kuritsa River (a right tributary of the Seym River), 87 km from the Russia–Ukraine border, 13.5 km north-west of Kursk, 3.5 km from the selsoviet center – Polyanskoye.

 Climate
2nd Anpilogovo has a warm-summer humid continental climate (Dfb in the Köppen climate classification).

Transport 
2nd Anpilogovo is located 7.5 km from the federal route  Crimea Highway (a part of the European route ), 4 km from the road of intermunicipal significance  (M2 "Crimea Highway" – Polyanskoye – border of the Oktyabrsky District), on the road  (38N-197 – 2nd Anpilogovo – Bolshoye Lukino), 16 km from the nearest railway station Kursk (railway lines: Oryol – Kursk, Kursk – 146 km and Lgov-I – Kursk).

The rural locality is situated 19 km from Kursk Vostochny Airport, 133 km from Belgorod International Airport and 222 km from Voronezh Peter the Great Airport.

References

Notes

Sources

Rural localities in Kursky District, Kursk Oblast